Castle Rock Spire is in the Beartooth Mountains in the U.S. state of Montana. The peak is one of the tallest in the Beartooth Mountains, the seventh tallest in Montana and in the Absaroka-Beartooth Wilderness of Custer and Gallatin National Forests. Castle Rock Spire is only  WSW of Castle Mountain. The Sundance Glacier lies on the north slopes of the peak.

References

Castle Rock Spire
Beartooth Mountains
Mountains of Carbon County, Montana